Fourteen referendums were held in Switzerland in 1978. The first four were held on 26 February on a popular initiative "for more co-decisions of the Federal Assembly and the People on national road making" (rejected), an amendment to the federal law on aged and bereaved insurance (approved), a popular initiative to lower the retirement age (rejected) and amending the article on the economic cycle in the Swiss Federal Constitution (approved). The next five referendums were held on 28 May on a law on time (rejected), an amendment to the tariff law (approved), a new federal law banning abortion (rejected), a federal law on promoting research and universities (rejected) and a popular initiative "for 12 Sundays a year free from motor vehicles" (rejected).

A tenth referendum was held on 24 September on creating a new canton named Jura, which was approved. The final set of referendums were held on 3 December on a resolution on dairy farming (approved), an animal protection law (approved), a federal law on security (rejected) and a federal law on vocational education (approved).

Results

February: Popular initiative on road making

February: Amendment to the federal law on aged and bereaved insurance

February: Lowering the retirement age

February: Constitutional amendment on the economic cycle

May: Law on time

May: Amendment to the tariff law

May: Federal law banning abortion

May: Federal law promoting research and universities

May: Popular initiative on 12 car-free Sundays a year

September: Creation of Jura canton

December: Dairy farming

December: Animal protection law

December: Federal law on security

December: Federal law on vocational education and training

References

1978 referendums
1978 in Switzerland
Referendums in Switzerland
Abortion referendums